That Was Then This Is Now is an album released by Minneapolis musician, Wain McFarlane in 2001.

Track listing 

 All Right - 4:08
 I'll Have My Day - 4:55
 I'm Coming Back - 5:08
 Blackstar - 3:42
 Lucky - 4:47
 Dreamer - 5:13
 That Was Then This Is Now - 4:19
 Bitch - 3:55
 Bridges - 5:04
 Never Seen You Cry - 4:11

See also 

 Wain McFarlane

External links 
 Wain McFarlane's MySpace
 That Was Then This Is Now on MSN Music



2001 albums